Trechus salassus is a species of ground beetle in the subfamily Trechinae. It was described by Jeannel in 1927.

References

salassus
Beetles described in 1927